Melanostomias niger, the fangtooth dragonfish, is a species of fish from the Melanostomias genus that is native to the Eastern Indian ocean, Southeast Atlantic and Southwest Pacific.

References 

Fish described in 1924